Fimbristylis ferruginea is a species of fimbry known by the common names rusty sedge and West Indian fimbry. The plant is common along the coast line and estuaries of Australia. It is also native to parts of Africa, southern Asia, and South America. The flowers are a distinctive rusty brown color appearing on a single spikelet from May to July.

References

External links
Online Field guide to Common Saltmarsh Plants of Queensland
New South Wales Flora Online

ferruginea
Plants described in 1753
Taxa named by Carl Linnaeus